The PDP-14 was a specialized computer from Digital Equipment Corporation’s Industrial Products Group designed to replace industrial level relay controls for machinery and machine tools that performed repetitive tasks. It was specifically designed to function in the harsh electrical environment encountered in facilities where electric motors, solenoids and arc welders were present, a significant adversity for normal computer electronics. The PDP-14 was specifically designed to be the first level of factory automation, functioning as a programmable logic controller (PLC), through its ability to communicate with a standard DEC PDP-8 minicomputer.

U.S patent, #3,753,243 was issued on August 14, 1973 to Alan Ricketts, Allan Devault, Russel Doane, John Dumser, John Holzer and assigned to Digital Equipment Corp.

The PDP-14 was designed to process Boolean equations, usually expressed as “ladder diagrams” and as such had a programmable read-only program (PROM) memory.  Programs were developed using a PDP-8 then tested using a direct connection to the PDP-14.  The PDP-14 was put into a check out mode where instructions were provided by the PDP-8. Following checkout, the PDP-8 provided the instructions to be put into the PROM.

Later versions (for example, the PDP-14/30, whose instruction set was not binary compatible) are based on PDP-8 physical packaging technology. There also was a PDP-14/35 and a lower cost/reduced I/O capability PDP-14/L.

Hardware
The 12-bit PDP-14 could hold a maximum of 4K words for instructions. The system's configuration included a control unit and a number of external boxes:
 I-boxes (BX14) were for discrete inputs from the controlled system. Up to 256 input sources could be addressed. 

 O-boxes (BY14) could control up to 255 actuators in the controlled system. 
 A-boxes could be filled with timer modules for controlling time-driven events or retentive storage modules which were not cleared with power loss. A-boxes occupied the output address space along with the O-boxes. 
 S-boxes were essentially the same as the O-boxes, but there was no real output device. This enabled storing intermediate results. S-boxes also used the shared output address space. 

Hence the combined usable output address space of the O-boxes, A-boxes and S-boxes was 255 or fewer.

Registers
The PDP-14 has seven 12-bit registers: 
 IR
 PC1 & PC2
 MB
 SPARE
 INPUT and OUTPUT.

Instructions
Among the PDP-14 instructions were:
 TRR to move data between some (but not all) of the registers TRansfer Register (contents).
PC1 and SPARE have increment and decrement capabilities, permitting TRR to modify the value loaded into the register. 
 JMS JuMp to Subroutine at the address specified in the following 12-bit word.
 JMR JuMp to RETURN from a subroutine, to ADDRESS+1 of the most recent JMS.
effectively, in modern terminology, JMS pushed the current instruction address onto a "stack"
and JMR popped the return address.
In effect, JMR is actually a specific TRR in which PC2 is transferred to PC1. 
 SKP SKiP is a TRR in which PC1 is incremented by 1.

There were also TEST instructions (Test if something is ON or OFF) and SET instructions (SYN Set "Y" oN, SYF Set "Y" ofF).

Software
The original PDP-14 required that programming be done by DEC.

Subsequently, software development for the PDP-14 was done on another system, the PDP-8. A PDP-8 
program named SIM-14 allowed for simulating the PDP-14.

Photos
 PDP-14
 PDP-14's M740 Instruction decoder module
 PDP-14's M745 PDP-8 Interface

See also
 PDP-16

References

External links
 PDP-14 User's Manual
 includes information about interfacing options

DEC computers
Industrial_automation
Industrial_computing
Programmable_logic_controllers